Makhta may refer to:
 Lernarot, Armenia
 Maxta, Azerbaijan